The 2012–13 NCAA Division II men's ice hockey season began on October 26, 2012 and concluded on March 2 of the following year. This was the 31st season of second-tier college ice hockey.

Regular season

Standings

See also
 2012–13 NCAA Division I men's ice hockey season
 2012–13 NCAA Division III men's ice hockey season

References

External links

 
NCAA